Johannes Franciscus "Joop" Braakhekke (11 April 1941 – 8 December 2016) was a Dutch chef, restaurateur, television presenter and author.

Life
Braakhekke was born in Apeldoorn in the Veluwe, where he grew up. As a child he wanted to become an actor, but eventually settled on becoming a restaurateur. After high school he went to Paris and Barcelona to learn culinary arts. In 1968 he returned to the Netherlands and worked as a restaurateur, first in Apeldoorn, at the bistro Le Philosophe, and then in Amsterdam, at De Kersentuin, Le Garage, and En Pluche.

For five years beginning in 1993 Braakhekke was a presenter on the popular television cooking program Kookgek, and wrote a cookbook.

Trivia 
In December 2008 Braakhekke won the Loden Leeuw prize for appearing in an air freshener advertisement in the Netherlands. The prize is awarded to the most annoying celebrity in a television commercial.

References

1941 births
2016 deaths
Businesspeople from Amsterdam
Dutch autobiographers
Dutch chefs
Dutch food writers
Dutch health and wellness writers
Dutch television presenters
Dutch male writers
Dutch LGBT writers
Dutch LGBT entertainers
Dutch LGBT businesspeople
Dutch restaurateurs
Deaths from pancreatic cancer
Deaths from cancer in the Netherlands
People from Apeldoorn
Writers from Amsterdam